The 1994–95 Michigan State Spartans men's basketball team represented Michigan State University in the 1994–95 NCAA Division I men's basketball season. The team played their home games at Breslin Center in East Lansing, Michigan and were members of the Big Ten Conference. They were coached by Jud Heathcote in his 19th and final season at Michigan State. The Spartans finished the season with a record of 22–6, 14–4 in Big Ten play to finish in second place, one game behind Purdue. They received an at-large bid to the NCAA tournament as the No. 3 seed in the Southeast region, where they were upset by 14th-seeded Weber State in the First Round. The game marked the final game Heathcote's coaching tenure at MSU. Longtime assistant coach Tom Izzo would take over the following year.

Previous season
The Spartans finished the 1993–94 season with an overall record of 20–12, 10–8 in Big Ten play to finish in fourth place. Michigan State received an at-large bid as a No. 7 seed to the NCAA tournament. There they defeated Seton Hall before losing to Duke in the Second Round.

Season 
The Spartans were led by All-American Shawn Respert, who averaged 25.6 points per game.

The Spartans began their season ranked No. 18 in the country and on the road, avenging a prior loss to UIC a few years prior. A win over Louisville preceded a trip to future Big Ten foe Nebraska. In a high scoring game, the Spartans were outscored 96–91. MSU went on to win their next seven games including their first two conference games, wins over Wisconsin and No. 22-ranked Iowa moving the Spartans to No. 14 in the country. A loss at Indiana led to another seven-games winning streak, including wins over non-conference foe Oklahoma State and rival Michigan pushing MSU to a No. 7 ranking.. A home loss to No. 25 Purdue and No. 24 Minnesota in two of their next four games dropped MSU out of the top ten rankings, slipping to 12th. The Spartans would rally to win four of their final five games to finish the regular season ranked No. 11 and one game behind conference champions Purdue.

The Spartans received an at-large bid to the NCAA Tournament as the No. 3 seed in the Southeast region. The Spartans overlooked No. 14 seed Weber State in the First Round and were stunned 79–72. MSU led by nine at the half against the Wildcats, but were outscored by 16 in the second half.

Roster and statistics

Schedule and results

|-
!colspan=9 style=| Regular season

|-
!colspan=9 style=|NCAA tournament

Rankings

Source.

Awards and honors
 Shawn Respert – All-Big Ten First Team

References

Michigan State Spartans men's basketball seasons
Michigan State
Michigan State
Michigan State Spartans men's b
Michigan State Spartans men's b